Bad Guy is a 1937 American crime film directed by Edward L. Cahn and written by Earl Felton and Harry Ruskin. The film stars Bruce Cabot, Virginia Grey, Edward Norris, Jean Chatburn and Cliff Edwards. It was released on August 27, 1937 by Metro-Goldwyn-Mayer.

Plot
Power linesman Lucky Walden kills the crooked gambler who had cheated him. He is convicted and sentenced to death.

Lucky's one chance is for his brother Steve to locate an eyewitness who can testify that Lucky killed the man in self-defense. When the man is found and corroborates the story, Lucky is awarded a stay of execution. He then earns a full parole by risking his life when saving a fellow inmate from some dangerous high-voltage wires.

Lucky returns to his old vices. He violates his parole and is returned to prison. Lucky coaxes Steve into helping him rig the prison's electrical bars to help him escape. Steve's girlfriend Kitty is also attracted to Lucky and wants him out of prison. The cops chase Lucky until he is electrocuted by the electrified wires. Steve is sentenced to jail.

Cast 
 Bruce Cabot as 'Lucky' Walden
 Virginia Grey as Kitty
 Edward Norris as Steve Carroll
 Jean Chatburn as Betty
 Cliff Edwards as 'Hi-Line'
 Charley Grapewin as Dan Gray
 Warren Hymer as 'Shorty'
 John Hamilton as Warden
 Clay Clement as Bronson
 Roger Converse as Detective

References

External links 
 
 
 
 

1937 films
1930s English-language films
American crime films
1937 crime films
Metro-Goldwyn-Mayer films
Films directed by Edward L. Cahn
American black-and-white films
Films scored by Edward Ward (composer)
1930s American films